Ian James Duncan, Baron Duncan of Springbank (born 13 February 1973) is a Scottish politician serving as a deputy speaker in the House of Lords. A member of the Conservative Party, he was formerly Minister for Climate Change in the Department for Business, Energy and Industrial Strategy and minister in the Northern Ireland Office. He initially joined the UK Government as a Scotland Office minister following the 2017 UK general election. Duncan was a Member of the European Parliament (MEP) for Scotland from 2014 to 2017. He is the only minister to have served in each of the UK Government's territorial offices.

Early life 
Duncan was born on 13 February 1973 and raised in Alyth, Perthshire, where he attended Alyth High School. He achieved a Bachelor of Science (BSc) degree in geology from the University of St Andrews in 1994, and subsequently earned a PhD degree in paleontology from the University of Bristol in 1997.

Career before politics 
During the late 1990s Duncan served as a policy analyst for BP's political affairs team, where he worked on the company's strategy for emerging economic prospects in post-communist eastern Europe and the former Soviet Union.

In 1999 Duncan became the deputy chief executive, and secretary for the Scottish Fishermen's Federation, where he developed policy and worked closely with the European Union, lobbying for the development of a regional management model that was later adopted by the European Commission.

From 2004 to 2005 he acted as the head of policy & communication for the Scottish Refugee Council, a charity which offers advice to those taking asylum within Scotland.

Duncan served as Head of the EU Office for the Scottish Parliament in Brussels from 2005 and 2011. Thereafter he was appointed Clerk to the Parliament's European Committee and EU Advisor to the Parliament. He resigned from his position in 2013 to pursue candidacy for the upcoming European elections with the Scottish Conservatives, following Struan Stevenson's announcement that he would not seek re-election.

Political career

Member of the European Parliament 
As a candidate for the Scottish Conservatives at the 2014 European election, Duncan campaigned on a platform of delivering reform in the European Union as well as an in-out referendum within three years.

Duncan sat on three committees of the European Parliament: the Committee on Industry, Research and Energy, the Committee on the Environment, Public Health and Food Safety and the Committee on Fisheries. He was the European Parliament's rapporteur on post-2020 reforms to the European Union Emissions Trading Scheme.

From 2014 Duncan served as the chief whip of the UK Conservative delegation. He was also a vice-chair of the Wine, Spirits and Quality Foodstuffs intergroup in the European Parliament.

In 2017, Duncan was ranked as the 10th-most influential MEP on environmental policy in the European Parliament. and the 6th-most influential on energy policy. EurActiv ranked Duncan as the 15th-most influential politician on energy union in Europe in 2016.

Duncan resigned as an MEP in 2017. He was replaced by The Baroness Mobarik.

UK Parliament candidate
Duncan was selected by the Scottish Conservatives as their candidate for Perth and North Perthshire in the 2017 UK general election. He lost to incumbent Pete Wishart, of the Scottish National Party, by 21 votes.

UK Government Minister
After he failed to win the Perth constituency, the Prime Minister's Office announced in June 2017 that Duncan would be granted a life peerage and thus become a member of the House of Lords, in order to take up his appointment as Parliamentary Under-Secretary of State for Scotland and for Wales. On 14 July, he was created Baron Duncan of Springbank, of Springbank in the County of Perth.

Following a reshuffle Duncan was appointed a minister in the Northern Ireland Office and demitted office in the Wales Office. He retained his position in the Scotland Office until 2019.

Personal life 
Outside politics, Duncan maintains a keen interest in public speaking. He is the honorary president of English Speaking Union Scotland, previously serving as Chairman (2014–2017) and Speech & Debates Officer. Duncan is a former English-Speaking Union US Debating Scholar (1995). He retains links to academia, acting as an advisor to University of St Andrews' Institute of Legal and Constitutional Research. Duncan is a fellow of the Geological Society.

In 2014, Duncan was appointed to the board of advisers of the Schwarzenegger Institute at the University of Southern California, established by former California governor Arnold Schwarzenegger.

He is a patron of LGBT+ Conservatives and is openly gay.

Notes

References 

|-

1973 births
Living people
Alumni of the University of St Andrews
BP people
British charity and campaign group workers
Conservative Party (UK) life peers
Life peers created by Elizabeth II
Gay politicians
LGBT life peers
LGBT MEPs for the United Kingdom
Scottish LGBT politicians
MEPs for Scotland 2014–2019
People from Perthshire
Scottish Conservative Party MEPs
Scottish Conservative Party parliamentary candidates